Marcus Cook Connelly (December 13, 1890 – December 21, 1980) was an American playwright, director, producer, performer, and lyricist. He was a key member of the Algonquin Round Table, and received the Pulitzer Prize for Drama in 1930.

Biography
Connelly was born to actor and hotelier Patrick Joseph Connelly and actress Mabel Fowler Cook in McKeesport, Pennsylvania. His father died in 1902. Connelly attended Trinity Hall boarding school in Washington, Pennsylvania, after which he began collecting money for ads in The Pittsburgh Press to help to support his mother. He began writing plays at the age of five.

His initial newspaper job led to Connelly's working as an Associated Press cub reporter, after which he became a junior reporter for The Pittsburgh Gazette Times. Eventually he began writing a humor column for that newspaper.  He also became a journalist for the Pittsburgh Sun-Telegraph until he moved to New York City. In 1919 he joined the Algonquin Round Table.

While he was working in Pittsburgh, Connelly ventured into writing for the stage, creating skits for shows put on by an athletic association and one-act plays for a little theater group. His interest in the theater increased after he began reporting on the theater beat for The Morning Telegraph in New York City. In that role he developed a friendship with George S. Kaufman, who wrote about drama for The New York Times.

Connelly had contributed to several Broadway musicals before teaming up with his most important collaborator, Kaufman, in 1921. During their four-year partnership, they wrote five comedies – Dulcy (1921), To the Ladies (1922), Merton of the Movies (1922), The Deep Tangled Wildwood (1923) and Beggar on Horseback (1924) – and also co-directed and contributed sketches to the 1922 revue The '49ers, collaborated on the book to the musical comedy Helen of Troy, New York (1923), and wrote both the book and lyrics for another musical comedy, Be Yourself (1924).

Connelly received the Pulitzer Prize for Drama for The Green Pastures in 1930. The play, a re-telling of episodes from the Old Testament, was staged with the first all-black Broadway cast. He contributed verse and articles to Life, Everybody's, and other magazines.

Connelly was one of the wittiest members of the Algonquin Round Table. He said, "I always knew children were anti-social. But the children of the West Side – they're savage."

Connelly was a drama teacher at Yale University from 1946 to 1950. In 1968, Connelly published his memoirs, Voices Offstage. Over the years, Connelly appeared as an actor in 21 movies, including The Spirit of St. Louis (1957) with James Stewart.

A film about the Round Table members, The Ten-Year Lunch (1987), won the Academy Award for Best Documentary Feature and featured Connelly, who was the last survivor. The 1994 film Mrs. Parker and the Vicious Circle, a fictional account of the group, featured actor Matt Malloy as Connelly.

Connelly died on December 21, 1980, in St. Luke's Hospital in Manhattan, aged 90.

Filmography

References

External links
 
 
 
Algonquin Round Table Walking Tours
Algonquin Round Table page at the Algonquin Hotel's web site
Algonquin Circle Links
Stephen Wilde Official Website

1890 births
1980 deaths
20th-century American dramatists and playwrights
People from McKeesport, Pennsylvania
Writers from Pennsylvania
Writers from New York City
Pulitzer Prize for Drama winners
American male journalists
American male dramatists and playwrights
20th-century American male actors
American male film actors
American male television actors
The New Yorker people
Journalists from Pennsylvania
20th-century American male writers
20th-century American non-fiction writers
20th-century American journalists
Algonquin Round Table
Members of the American Academy of Arts and Letters